Metastelma blodgettii, or Blodgett's swallow-wort, is a species of perennial plant in the dogbane family. It is endemic to southern Florida and the Bahamas. It is listed as threatened in Florida.

References

blodgettii
Taxa named by Asa Gray
Flora of Florida
Flora of the Bahamas
Plants described in 1877